Andreia Bandeira (born 3 May 1987) is a Brazilian amateur boxer who competes in the 75–76 kg weight division. She won a gold medal at the 2010 South American Games and qualified for the 2016 Summer Olympics.

References

1987 births
Living people
Boxers at the 2016 Summer Olympics
Olympic boxers of Brazil
Brazilian women boxers
South American Games gold medalists for Brazil
South American Games medalists in boxing
Competitors at the 2010 South American Games
Middleweight boxers
Sportspeople from São Paulo
21st-century Brazilian women